Olivellinae, are a subfamily of small predatory sea snails with smooth, shiny, elongated oval-shaped shells, in the family Olividae. The shells sometimes show muted but attractive colors, and may have some patterning.

These animals are marine gastropod molluscs in the superfamily Olivoidea, within the order Neogastropoda according to the taxonomy of Bouchet and Rocroi.

Distribution
Olivella snails are found worldwide, but mostly Ecuador in subtropical and tropical seas and oceans.

Habitat and habit
These snails are found on sandy substrates intertidally and subtidally.
These snails are all carnivorous sand-burrowers.

Shell description

The shells are basically oval and cylindrical in shape.  They have a well-developed stepped spire.  Olivella shells have a siphonal notch at the posterior end of the long narrow aperture. The siphon of the living animal protrudes from the siphon notch.

The shell surface is extremely glossy because in life the mantle almost always covers the shell.

The fossil record
Olive shells first appeared during the Campanian.

Genera
 Callianax H. Adams & A. Adams, 1853
 Cupidoliva Iredale, 1924
 Olivella Swainson, 1831
Genera brought into synonymy
 Dactylidia H. Adams & A. Adams, 1853: synonym of Olivella Swainson, 1831
 Olivina d'Orbigny, 1841: synonym of Olivella Swainson, 1831

References

External links
 Kantor Yu.I., Fedosov A.E., Puillandre N., Bonillo C. & Bouchet P. (2017). Returning to the roots: morphology, molecular phylogeny and classification of the Olivoidea (Gastropoda: Neogastropoda). Zoological Journal of the Linnean Society. 180(3): 493-541